Stuart McKenzie may refer to:

Stuart McKenzie (Australian footballer) (born 1961), Australian rules footballer
Stuart McKenzie (footballer, born 1967), English professional footballer